RTI(-4229)-150, ((−)-2β-Carbocyclobutoxy-3β-(4-methylphenyl)tropane) is a phenyltropane derivative which acts as a potent dopamine reuptake inhibitor and stimulant drug. It is around 5x more potent than cocaine, but is more selective for the dopamine transporter relative to the other monoamine transporters. RTI-150 has a fast onset of effects and short duration of action, and its abuse potential in animal studies is similar to that of cocaine itself; its main application in scientific research has been in studies investigating the influence of pharmacokinetics on the abuse potential of stimulant drugs, with the rapid entry of RTI-150 into the brain thought to be a key factor in producing its high propensity for development of dependence in animals. RTI-150 is not explicitly illegal anywhere in the world, but its similar structure and pharmacological activity to cocaine makes it possible that it would be considered a controlled substance analogue in countries such as the USA, Canada, Australia and New Zealand which have controlled substance analogue legislation.

See also 
 List of cocaine analogues

References 

Stimulants
RTI compounds
Tropanes
Dopamine reuptake inhibitors
Cyclobutyl compounds